Melbourne Square may refer to:
 Melbourne Square (complex), an approved for construction skyscraper complex in Melbourne, Australia
 Melbourne Square (mall), a shopping mall in Melbourne, United States